Agartha (sometimes Agartta, Agharti, Agarath, Agarta, Agharta, or Agarttha) is a legendary kingdom that is said to be located on the inner surface of the Earth. It is sometimes related to the belief in a hollow Earth and is a popular subject in esotericism.

History
The legend of Agartha remained mostly obscure in Europe until Gérard Encausse edited and re-published a detailed 1886 account by the nineteenth-century French occultist Alexandre Saint-Yves d'Alveydre (1842-1909), Mission de l'Inde en Europe,
in 1910.

After World War I German occultist groups such as the Thule Society took an interest in Agartha.

In his 1922 book Beasts, Men and Gods, the Polish explorer Ferdynand Ossendowski relates a story which was imparted to him concerning a subterranean kingdom existing inside the Earth. This kingdom was known to a fictional Buddhist society as Agharti.

Connections to mythology
Agartha is frequently associated or confused with Shambhala which figures prominently in Vajrayana Buddhism and Tibetan Kalachakra teachings and revived in the West by Madame Blavatsky and the Theosophical Society.  Theosophists in particular regard Agarthi as a vast complex of caves underneath Tibet inhabited by demi-gods, called asuras.  Helena and Nicholas Roerich, whose teachings closely parallel theosophy, see Shambhala's existence as both spiritual and physical.

See also
 Dwarf (mythology)
 Hades
 Xibalba

References

External links
 Map/diagram of Agharta and the Hollow Earth, based on writings of Raymond W. Bernard.
 On Edward Bulwer-Lytton: Agharta, Shambhala, Vril and the Occult Roots of Nazi Power, by Joseph George Caldwell.
 "An Algorithmic Agartha"—Essay-Contribution to Culture Machine 16, 2015 (the journal's Special-Issue on Drone Culture).Welcome to the Electrocene, An Algorithmic Agartha.

Mythological populated places
Hollow Earth